Grønnebakkan is part of the town of Harstad within Harstad Municipality in Troms county, Norway.

Development there started during the late 1970s on a large hill overlooking the city.  The upper part was originally built to house employees of the local hospital and police, but as development continued other people also bought property and settled there.  Development there continued through the 1980s.  Grønnebakkan Kindergarten (Grønnebakkan Barnehage) was built in 1990, and is a privately owned kindergarten. It is one of Harstad's biggest and newest kindergartens and it has contributed to more and more family settlements in Grønnebakkan.

Before the development began, this area is the location of paths which led to the nearby lakes Pevatnet and Musvatnet.  These were popular paths for hiking through the woods and mountains. Most of these paths still exist today but because of deforestation these paths are not as popular and used as they once used to be.  Grønnebakkan is known for its panoramic view over the city of Harstad.

References

Harstad
Neighbourhoods in Norway